Devario auropurpureus is a small species of danionin fish endemic to Lake Inle in Myanmar. It is a schooling species associated with submerged vegetation. It is harvested for aquarium trade, and usually sold under the older name Inlecypris auropurpurea.

It can reach  in total length.

References

External links
 Inlecypris auropurpurea
 Inlecypris auropurpurea breeding factsheet

Devario
Cyprinid fish of Asia
Fish of Myanmar
Endemic fauna of Myanmar
Fish described in 1918
Taxa named by Nelson Annandale